Kayrakly (Qayraqlı) is a rural locality (a selo) in Aksyonovsky Selsoviet, Alsheyevsky District, Bashkortostan, Russia. The population was 186 as of 2010. There are 5 streets.

Geography 
Kayrakly is located 41 km southwest of Rayevsky (the district's administrative centre) by road. Yarabaykul is the nearest rural locality.

References 

Rural localities in Alsheyevsky District